The Ten Commandments Monument is installed on the Texas State Capitol grounds (behind the Capitol building) in Austin, Texas, United States. The Texas Sunset Red Granite artwork was designed by an unknown artist and erected by the Fraternal Order of Eagles of Texas in 1961. It was the subject of litigation in the Supreme Court case Van Orden v. Perry (2005).

See also

 1961 in art
 Ten Commandments Monument (Little Rock, Arkansas)
 Ten Commandments Monument (Oklahoma City)

References

External links
 

1961 establishments in Texas
1961 sculptures
Granite sculptures in Texas
Monuments and memorials in Texas
Outdoor sculptures in Austin, Texas
Ten Commandments
Fraternal Order of Eagles